= North Western Metropolitan Area =

North Western Metropolitan Area (NWMA) is a name given to the densely populated area of Europe situated at the demographic core of the old-line members of the European Union. It has about 137 million inhabitants and comprises parts of Belgium, France, Germany, Luxembourg, The Netherlands, and the United Kingdom. The center of the NWMA is formed by the triangle with apexes at London, Brussels and Paris; this central area is sometimes called the Central Capitals Region (CCR).
